Ryles may refer to:

Places
 Ryles Jazz Club, Cambridge, Massachusetts, United States

People with the surname
 Jason Ryles (born 1979), Australian rugby player
 John Wesley Ryles (born 1950), American musician
 Nancy Ryles (1937–1990), American politician

See also
 Ryle (disambiguation)